Maple Grove is an unincorporated community in Jasper County, in the U.S. state of Missouri.

History
A post office called Maple Grove was established in 1879, the name was changed to Maplegrove in 1894, and the post office closed in 1901. The community was named for a grove of maple trees near the original town site.

References

Unincorporated communities in Jasper County, Missouri
Unincorporated communities in Missouri